The IPSC Handgun World Shoot is the highest level handgun match within the International Practical Shooting Confederation (IPSC) which consists of several days and at least 30 separate courses of fire. The Handgun World Shoots are held triennially on a rotational cycle with the other two main IPSC disciplines Rifle and Shotgun.

World Shoot main matches are held over six days with five days of shooting and one rest day, making the competition a shooting marathon where strategy and mental focus is of critical importance.

History 
The first IPSC World Shoot was held in 1975 in Zurich, and the two following were held with one year intervals. After 1977 the World Shoots were held at two year intervals until 1983 when the schedule was changed to the three year intervals used today.

Until and including 1991 there were no equipment divisions, but equipment had gradually become more and more specialized with extended front sights, compensators and even optical sights. At the 1991 Handgun World Shoot in Adelaide, Australia, Doug Koenig of USA became the first competitor to win the World Shoot using a red dot sight. In the following 1993 Handgun World Shoot competitors would be divided into divisions based on the equipment, thereof whether the firearm had an optical sight and compensator (Open or Modified division) or iron sights (Standard division). In 1999 the Revolver and Production divisions were introduced, and became recognized divisions from January 2000, making their first appearance in World Level competition at the 2002 Handgun World Shoot. In 2011 the Modified division was retired to make room for the Classic division, in commemoration of the 1911 single stack which historically had been so important for IPSC Handgun and handgun shooting sports in general for many years.

List of Handgun World Shoots 
 1975 Handgun World Shoot in Zürich, Switzerland
 1976 Handgun World Shoot in Salzburg, Austria
 1977 Handgun World Shoot in Salisbury, Rhodesia
 1979 Handgun World Shoot in Roodepoort, Johannesburg, South Africa 
 1981 Handgun World Shoot in Johannesburg, South Africa
 1983 Handgun World Shoot in Virginia, United States
 1986 Handgun World Shoot in Florida, United States
 1988 Handgun World Shoot in Caracas, Venezuela
 1990 Handgun World Shoot in Adelaide, Australia
 1991 Individual Handgun World Championship, Johannesburg, South Africa
 1993 Handgun World Shoot at the National Shooting Centre at Bisley, Bisley, Surrey, England
 1996 Handgun World Shoot in Brasilia, Brazil
 1999 Handgun World Shoot in Cebu, Philippines
 2002 Handgun World Shoot in Pietersburg, South Africa
 2005 Handgun World Shoot in Guayaquil, Ecuador
 2008 Handgun World Shoot in Bali, Indonesia
 2011 Handgun World Shoot in Rhodes, Greece
 2014 Handgun World Shoot in Frostproof, Florida, United States
 2017 Handgun World Shoot at the National Shooting Center in Châteauroux, France
 2022 Handgun World Shoot in Thailand

Individual Champions 

The following is a list of previous and current Handgun World Champions:

Overall category

Lady category

Junior category

Senior category

Super Senior category

Teams 

Teams can consist of up to four athletes, with the three highest individual scores counting for the team results.

Overall teams

Lady teams

See also 
 IPSC Rifle World Shoots
 IPSC Shotgun World Shoots
 IPSC Action Air World Shoots
 List of world sports championships

References 
Match Report - 1977 Handgun World Shoot, Rhodesia
Match Results - 1983 Handgun World Shoot, USA - American Handgunnger March/ April 1984, page 34
Match Results - 1988 Handgun World Shoot - USPSA Front Sight November/ December 1988, page 9 
Match Results - 1990 Handgun World Shoot, Australia
Match Results - 1991 Individual World Championship, South Africa 
Match Results - 1993 Handgun World Shoot, England - Diligentia: The Official Newsletter of IPSC Canada, February 1994, page 26
Match Results - 1996 Handgun World Shoot, Brazil - USPSA Frontsight 3. 1997, page 14 
Match Results - 1999 Handgun World Shoot, Philippines
Match Results - 2002 Handgun World Shoot, South Africa 
IPSC :: Match Results - 2005 Handgun World Shoot, Ecuador
IPSC :: Match Results - 2008 Handgun World Shoot, Indonesia
IPSC :: Match Results - 2011 Handgun World Shoot, Greece
IPSC :: Match Results - 2014 Handgun World Shoot, United States

External links 
Promo: 2014 IPSC Handgun World Shoot, Florida, United States